The 2022–23 season is HNK Hajduk Split's 112th season in existence and the club's 32nd consecutive season in the top flight of Croatian football. In addition to the domestic league, Hajduk Split are participating in this season's edition of the Croatian Cup and the UEFA Europa Conference League. The season covers the period from 1 July 2022 to 30 June 2023.

First-team squad
For details of former players, see List of HNK Hajduk Split players.

Competitions

Overview

SuperSport HNL

Classification

Results summary

Results by round

Results by opponent

Source: 2022–23 Croatian Football League article

Matches

Friendlies

Pre-season

On-season

Mid-season

Croatian Football Super Cup

SuperSport HNL

Croatian Football Cup

UEFA Europa Conference League

Third qualifying round

Play-off round

Player seasonal records
Updated 18 March 2023

Goals

Source: Competitive matches

Clean sheets

Source: Competitive matches

Disciplinary record

Appearances and goals

Transfers

In

Total Spending:  800,000 €

Out

Total Income:  14,820,000 €

Total profit:  14,020,000 €

Promoted from youth squad

Notes

References

External links

HNK Hajduk Split seasons
Hajduk Split
Hajduk Split